The Music City Stars, formerly known as the Nashville Broncs, was an expansion team in the American Basketball Association (ABA) that played from 2008 to 2010. Located in Nashville, Tennessee, the team was named for the city's association with music industry celebrities; it also referred the Music City Star, a regional rail service. They played the home games of their inaugural season at Nashville Municipal Auditorium, but played at Lipscomb University's Allen Arena for the 2009–10 season. The team ceased operations on January 29, 2010, citing poor ticket sales.

Team history
The team, when owned by Scott Lumley, was known as the Nashville Broncs during their inaugural 2008 to 2009 season. That year, they finished with a 23–4 record, making it as far as the semifinals before being eliminated. In July 2009, the team changed ownership and its name to the Music City Stars. After playing only 12 games of the 2009–10 season (many games were cancelled due to teams leaving the league), the Stars shut down operations due to lagging ticket sales.

Season-by-season record

External links
Official website

Defunct American Basketball Association (2000–present) teams
Sports in Nashville, Tennessee
Basketball teams established in 2008
Basketball teams disestablished in 2010
Basketball teams in Tennessee
2008 establishments in Tennessee
2010 disestablishments in Tennessee